Leonard Roy Petch (born 24 November 1954) is a former Australian rules footballer who played with Hawthorn in the Victorian Football League (VFL).

References

External links

1954 births
Living people
Australian rules footballers from Victoria (Australia)
Hawthorn Football Club players